An archimime is a chief buffoon or jester. Among the ancient Romans, archimimes were persons who imitated the manners, gestures, and speech both of the living and the deceased. At first, they were only employed in the theatre, but were afterwards admitted to their feasts, and at last to funerals. At funerals, archimimes walked behind the corpse, imitating the gestures and behaviors of the person being carried to the funeral pyre, as if they were still alive.

References

Death customs
Entertainment occupations
Ancient Roman occupations
Stock characters
Jesters